There Must Be More to Love Than This is an album by Jerry Lee Lewis that was released on Mercury Records in 1971.

Summary 
The theme of adultery looms large on this album, containing "cheatin' songs" like "Home Away from Home," "Woman, Woman (Get Out of My Way)" (co-written by his sister Linda Gail Lewis) and the Jerry Chesnut-penned title track, which had soared to the top of the country charts in 1970.  Another stand out cut is Lewis's rendition of Charlie Rich's "Life's Little Ups and Downs," a song that celebrates marriage and forgiveness, an ironic choice since Jerry Lee's marriage to his wife Myra was crumbling. Lewis remains especially fond of "Sweet Georgia Brown" – specifically guitarist Kenny Lovelace's fiddle break in the song, enthusing to biographer Rick Bragg in 2014, "He did that fiddle break on that thing – it's somethin' else, isn't it?  I mean, you can never capture that again, like that. Oh man!  What a record!  It's so far above – so far ahead of anybody's thinkin' in the music business that they could never comprehend the meaning of it. It had the flavor of everything."

There Must Be More to Love Than This was another hit album for Lewis, peaking at number 8 on the Billboard country charts. In 2009, Lewis biographer Joe Bonomo calls "One More Time" a "beautifully sung song in its balance of egoism and compromise, and Ned Davis' steel guitar mourns the valid regret at its center."

Track listing

Personnel
Jerry Lee Lewis – vocals, piano
Buck Hutcheson, Chip Young, Harold Bradley, Ray Edenton – guitar
Ned Davis – steel guitar
Kenny Lovelace – fiddle
Bob Moore, Eddie DeBruhl – bass
Buddy Harman, Kenny Buttrey – drums

Charts

Weekly charts

Year-end charts

References

1971 albums
Jerry Lee Lewis albums
Albums produced by Jerry Kennedy
Mercury Records albums